Senegalia berlandieri (Berlandier acacia, guajillo acacia, guajillo, huajillo, huajilla) is a shrub native to the Southwestern United States and northeast Mexico that belongs to the Mimosoid clade of Fabaceae. The berlandieri epithet comes from the name of Jean-Louis Berlandier, a French naturalist who studied wildlife native to Texas and Mexico. S. berlandieri contains a wide variety of alkaloids and has been known to cause toxic reactions in domestic animals such as goats.

Uses
Senegalia berlandieri is toxic to livestock and thus should not be used as forage or fodder.

Alkaloids
Senegalia berlandieri contains a number of diverse alkaloids, the most plentiful of which are N-methylphenethylamine, tyramine, and phenethylamine. The total alkaloid content in dried leaves has been reported to be in the range 0.28-0.66%. 

Four phenolic amines (N-methyl-β-phenethylamine, tyramine, N-methyltyramine, and hordenine) has been detected.

Other trace alkaloids include nicotine, and mescaline (found in many cacti but infrequently in other plants). The same group of researchers later reported finding most of the same alkaloids in A. rigidula, a related species also native to the Southwestern U.S. There are no reports in the literature of these findings having been repeated, however, leading to the suggestion that they resulted from cross-contamination or were possibly artifacts of the analytical technique.

Illicit use in supplements 
After the FDA declared that the use of Acacia rigdula was unlawful in supplements (because of frequent adulteration with synthetic drugs), many supplement sellers began replacing previously reported 'rigdula' containing supplements with 'Acacia berlandieri'. Some of these products declare their Acacia extracts as containing Methylsynephrine, an entirely synthetic drug that has never been found in nature.

Gallery

References

External links

berlandieri
Flora of Texas
Flora of the Chihuahuan Desert
Trees of Chihuahua (state)
Trees of Coahuila
Trees of Nuevo León
Trees of Tamaulipas
Trees of Durango
Trees of Veracruz
Flora of the Mexican Plateau
Shrubs
Trees of the South-Central United States
Garden plants of North America
Drought-tolerant plants